Torn is a virtual reality, sci-fi, adventure game developed by Aspyr Media played from a first-person.

Reception

Awards
The game was nominated for "Immersive Reality Technical Achievement" at the D.I.C.E. Awards; for "Direction in Virtual Reality" at the National Academy of Video Game Trade Reviewers Awards; for "Music of the Year", "Best Original Soundtrack Album", and "Best Music for an Indie Game" at the 2019 G.A.N.G. Awards; for "Best Music/Sound Design" at the 2019 Webby Awards; and for "2018 Video Game Score of the Year" at the ASCAP Composers' Choice Awards.

References

2018 video games
Adventure games
Virtual reality games
PlayStation 4 games
Science fiction games
Single-player video games
Aspyr games
Video games developed in the United States
Windows games